The Kerala State Film Award for Best Book on Cinema is an award presented annually at the Kerala State Film Awards of India to the author of the best book on Malayalam cinema. The awards are managed directly by the Kerala State Chalachitra Academy under the Department of Cultural Affairs of the Government of Kerala.

Winners

See also
 Kerala State Film Award for Best Article on Cinema

References

External links
Official website
PRD, Govt. of Kerala: Awardees List

Kerala State Film Awards